The men's freestyle 96 kilograms is a competition featured at the 2010 World Wrestling Championships, and was held at the Olympic Stadium in Moscow, Russia on 11 September.

Results
Legend
F — Won by fall

Finals

Top half

Section 1

Section 2

Bottom half

Section 3

Section 4

Repechage

 Aleksey Krupnyakov of Kyrgyzstan originally won the bronze medal, but was disqualified after he tested positive for Nandrolone. Ruslan Sheikhau was raised to third and took the bronze medal.

References
Results Book, Pages 98–99

Men's freestyle 96 kg